El Daher, or  El Zaher, is one of the districts of Cairo, Egypt. It neighbours the districts of Abbaseya and Sakakini.

El Zaher is named as a gesture of respect to El Zaher Baibars, whose memoirs were recorded in the a long Arabic language modern folkloric tale  Seret El Zaher Baibars, as the term "Zaher" means the on who shines.

The Sakakini street was originally part of El Zaher, but it was later named after a huge European building built by a prominent French architect, and was owned by a patriarch (head of the family), Count Gabriel Habib Sakakini Pasha (1841-1923), and consists of a palace and a church in the area in 1897. In addition, Sakakini Pasha is known to have established the Roman Catholic Patriarchate in Faggala and the Roman Catholic Cemetery in Old Cairo.

Postal code
11563

References

Districts of Cairo